Ameiva, commonly called jungle-runners, is a genus of whiptail lizards that belongs to the family Teiidae.

Geographic range
Member species of the genus Ameiva are found in South America, Central America and the Caribbean (West Indies).
Their major habitat in four regions of Brazil include: Caatinga, Cerrado, the Amazonian rain forest, and the Amazonian savanna. 
Additionally, Ameiva ameiva has been introduced to Florida in the United States.

Species
Sourced from "The Reptile Database".

Nota bene: A binomial authority in parentheses indicates that the species was originally described in a genus other than Ameiva.

References

Further reading
Meyer FAA (1795). Synopsis reptilium, novam ipsorum sistens generum methodum, nec non Gottingensium huius ordinis animalium enumerationem. Göttingen: van den Hoek and Ruprecht. 32 pp. (Ameiva, new genus, p. 27). (in Latin).

External links

 
Lizard genera
Taxa named by Friedrich Albrecht Anton Meyer